Rob ("Shorty") Short (born August 11, 1972 in Maidstone, England) is a Canadian field hockey player.

Career 
Short played his first international senior tournament in 1995, at the Pan American Games in Mar del Plata. Highlights include the 1998 World Cup in the Netherlands where the Canadian team finished 8th, with Short scoring 4 goals in the 7 games. In 2000 he competed with the national hockey team of Canada at the Summer Olympics in Sydney, where the team finished 10th. A recent win (over Argentina in strokes) in Rio de Janeiro, Brazil, at the Pan American Games meant Rob competed in his second Olympic Games in Beijing in the summer of 2008.

Short has played club hockey at the highest level in the Netherlands since 1999; 3 years with HC Rotterdam, 2 years at Laren, and is currently playing his 9th year with HGC.  Last year with HGC, he won the EHL (Euro Hockey League) and took home the MVP of the European competition and with it 5000 Euro.

Both Short and his older brother Mark are avid poker players who play tournaments both online with PokerStars.com, and occasionally in casinos around the world.

In addition to playing field hockey, Short is also a business owner with Mantis Hockey, Voodoo America, & Omatas Sports, which all distribute field hockey sticks and equipment across North America.

Short currently splits time between Amsterdam and his family in North Vancouver, British Columbia.

International Senior Competitions
 1995 – Pan American Games, Mar del Plata (2nd)
 1996 – Olympic Qualifier, Barcelona (6th)
 1996 – World Cup Preliminary, Sardinia (2nd)
 1997 – World Cup Qualifier, Kuala Lumpur (5th)
 1998 – World Cup, Utrecht (8th)
 1998 – Commonwealth Games, Kuala Lumpur (not ranked)
 1999 – Pan American Games, Winnipeg (1st)
 2000 – Americas Cup, Cuba (2nd)
 2000 – Olympic Games, Sydney (10th)
 2001 – World Cup Qualifier, Edinburgh (8th)
 2002 – Commonwealth Games, Manchester (6th)
 2003 – Pan American Games, Santo Domingo (2nd)
 2004 – Olympic Qualifier, Madrid (11th)
 2004 – Pan Am Cup, London (2nd)
 2006 – Commonwealth Games, Melbourne (9th)
 2006 – World Cup Qualifier, Changzou City (10th)
 2007 – Pan American Games, Rio (1st)
 2008 – Olympic Games, Beijing (10th)
 2009 — Pan American Cup, Santiago (1st)
 2010 – Commonwealth Games, India (7th)
 2010 – World Cup, Delhi (11th)
 2011 – Pan American Games, Guadalajara, Mexico (2nd)

Education 

Rob graduated from UVIC (University of Victoria) with a Bachelor's Degree in Geography.  He has also since residing in Europe achieved a diploma at BCIT (British Columbia Institute of Technology) in Web Technologies. Rob looks forward to coaching hockey both Internationally and at the club level in the future and to progress in that career in 2011 he completed a Masters in International Coaching at the Johan Cruyff Institute in Sport at Amsterdam.

References

External links

 Profile on Fieldhockey Canada

1972 births
Living people
Field hockey people from British Columbia
British Columbia Institute of Technology alumni
British expatriates in the Netherlands
Canadian expatriate sportspeople in the Netherlands
Canadian male field hockey players
English emigrants to Canada
Field hockey players at the 1998 Commonwealth Games
Field hockey players at the 2000 Summer Olympics
Field hockey players at the 2002 Commonwealth Games
Field hockey players at the 2006 Commonwealth Games
Field hockey players at the 2007 Pan American Games
Field hockey players at the 2008 Summer Olympics
Field hockey players at the 2011 Pan American Games
Naturalized citizens of Canada
Olympic field hockey players of Canada
People from Delta, British Columbia
Sportspeople from Maidstone
Pan American Games gold medalists for Canada
Pan American Games silver medalists for Canada
Pan American Games medalists in field hockey
1998 Men's Hockey World Cup players
2010 Men's Hockey World Cup players
HC Rotterdam players
HGC players
Medalists at the 2007 Pan American Games
Medalists at the 2011 Pan American Games
Commonwealth Games competitors for Canada